Hypochrysops is a genus of butterflies in the family Lycaenidae first described by Cajetan Felder and Rudolf Felder in 1860. This particular genus is exclusive to the Australian area with only a few species straying into Papua New Guinea.

Food sources
The mistletoe plant is ambiguously claimed to be a food source for at least some species of Hypochrysops.

This might be so, but raises some questions because most Lycaenidae have parasitic or mutualistic, often highly specific, relationships with various species of ants, and ants have been reported to carry the eggs of the Apollo jewel butterfly (Hypochrysops apollo apollo) into their colonies inside ant plants of the genus Myrmecodia. Myrmecodia species have certain superficial resemblances to "mistletoes", but are epiphytic, not markedly parasitic, and are not in any parasitic plant family; they are in fact in the coffee family, Rubiaceae. It seems likely that Hypochrysops apollo apollo at least, might feed exclusively on ant food and ant larvae.

Species

Hypochrysops alyattes H. H. Druce, 1891
Hypochrysops anacletus C. Felder, 1860
Hypochrysops antiphon Grose-Smith, 1897
Hypochrysops apelles Fabricius, 1775
H. a. singkepe D'Abrera, 1977
Hypochrysops apollo Miskin, 1891
H. a. phoebus Waterhouse, 1928
H. a. wendisi Bethune-Baker, 1909
Hypochrysops architas H. H. Druce, 1891
H. a. cratevas H. H. Druce, 1891
H. a. marie Tennent, 2001
H. a. suethes H. H. Druce, 1891
Hypochrysops aristocles Grose-Smith, 1898
Hypochrysops argyriorufa van Eecke, 1924
Hypochrysops arronica Felder, 1859
Hypochrysops aurantiaca Yagishita, 2004
Hypochrysops bakeri Joicey & Talbot, 1916
Hypochrysops boisduvali Oberthür, 1894
Hypochrysops byzos Boisduval, 1832
H. b. hecalius Miskin, 1884
Hypochrysops calliphon Grose-Smith, 1894
Hypochrysops castaneus Sands, 1986
Hypochrysops chrysanthis Felder, 1860
Hypochrysops chrysargyra Grose-Smith & Kirby, 1895
Hypochrysops chrysodesmus Grose-Smith & Kirby, 1899
Hypochrysops chrysotoxus Grose-Smith & Kirby, 1890
Hypochrysops cleon Grose-Smith, 1900
Hypochrysops coelisparsus Butler, 1883
H. c. kerri Riley, 1932
Hypochrysops coruscans Grose-Smith, 1897
H. c. subcaeruleum Grose-Smith & Kirby, 1896
H. c. ceramicum H. H. Druce, 1903
H. c. dinawa -Bethune-Baker, 1908
Hypochrysops cyane Waterhouse & Lyell, 1914
Hypochrysops delicia Hewitson, 1875
H. d. delos Waterhouse & Lyell, 1914
H. d. duaringae Waterhouse, 1903
H. d. regina Grose-Smith & Kirby, 1895
Hypochrysops dicomus Hewitson, 1874
Hypochrysops digglesii Hewitson, 1874
Hypochrysops dinawa Bethune-Baker, 1908
Hypochrysops dohertyi Oberthür, 1894
Hypochrysops doleschallii Felder, 1860
Hypochrysops elgneri Waterhouse & Lyell, 1909
H. e. barnardi Waterhouse, 1934
Hypochrysops emiliae D'Abrera, 1971
Hypochrysops epicurus Miskin, 1876
Hypochrysops eucletus Felder, 1865
H. e. dyope Grose-Smith & Kirby, 1895
H. e. eratosthenes Fruhstorfer, 1908
H. e. menandrus Fruhstorfer, 1908
H. e. vulcanicus D'Abrera, 1971
Hypochrysops eunice Fruhstorfer, 1915
Hypochyrsops felderi Oberthür, 1894
Hypochrysops ferruguineus Sands, 1986
Hypochrysops geminatus Sands, 1986
Hypochrysops halyaetus Hewitson, 1874
Hypochrysops herdonius Hewitson, 1874
Hypochrysops heros Grose-Smith, 1894
H. h. imogena D'Abrera, 1971
H. h. polemon Fruhstorfer, 1915
Hypochrysops hippuris Hewitson, 1874
Hypochrysops honora Grose-Smith, 1898
Hypochrysops hypates Hewitson, 1874
H. h. zeuxis Staudinger, 1888
Hypochrysops ignita Leach, 1814
H. i. chrysonotus Grose-Smith, 1899
H. i. erythrina Waterhouse & Lyell, 1909
H. i. olliffi Miskin, 1889
Hypochrysops lucilla D'Abrera, 1971
Hypochrysops luteus Sands, 1986
Hypochrysops makrikii Ribbe, 1900
Hypochrysops meeki Rothschild & Jordan, 1905
Hypochrysops mioswara Bethune-Baker, 1913
Hypochrysops mirabillis Pagenstecher, 1894
Hypochrysops miraculum H. H. Druce & Bethune-Baker, 1893
Hypochrysops miskini Waterhouse, 1903
Hypochrysops narcissus Fabricius, 1775
Hypochrysops pagenstecheri Ribbe, 1899
Hypochrysops piceata Kerr, Macqueen & Sands, 1969
Hypochrysops plotinus Grose-Smith, 1894
Hypochrysops polycletus Linnaeus, 1758
H. p. atromarginata H. H. Druce, 1891
H. p. brunnea H. H. Druce, 1903
H. p. epicletus Felder, 1859
H. p. hylaithus Fruhstorfer, 1908
H. p. hypochrysops Oberthür, 1880
H. p. kaystrus Fruhstorfer, 1908
H. p. linos Fruhstorfer, 1908
H. p. menyllus Fruhstorfer, 1908
H. p. oineus Fruhstorfer, 1908
H. p. rex Boisduval, 1832
H. p. rovena H. H. Druce, 1891
Hypochrysops pratti Bethune-Baker, 1913
Hypochrysops protogenes Felder, 1865
H. p. cleonides Grose-Smith, 1900
H. p. hermogenes Grose-Smith, 1894
H. p. pretiosus Grose-Smith, 1894
H. p. thesaurus Grose-Smith, 1894
Hypochrysops pyrodes Cassidy, 2003
Hypochrysops pythias Felder, 1865
H. p. aurifer Grose-Smith, 1898
H. p. drucei Oberthür, 1894
H. p. euclides Miskin, 1889
Hypochrysops resplendens Bethune-Baker, 1908
Hypochrysops ribbei Röber, 1886
Hypochrysops rufimargo Rothschild, 1915
Hypochrysops rufinus Grose-Smith, 1898
Hypochrysops scintillans Butler, 1882
H. s. carveri D'Abrera, 1971
H. s. carolina D'Abrera, 1971
H. s. constancea D'Abrera, 1971
H. s. squalliensis D'Abrera, 1971
Hypochrysops simplex Grose-Smith & Kirby, 1896
Hypochrysops siren Grose-Smith, 1894
Hypochrsops taeniata Jordan, 1908
Hypochrysops thauma Staudinger, 1895
Hypochrysops theon Felder, 1865
H. t. alix Grose-Smith, 1900
H. t. carmen Grose-Smith & Kirby, 1899
H. t. medocus Fruhstorfer, 1908
H. t. theonides Grose-Smith, 1894
H. t. theophanes Grose-Smith, 1894
Hypochrysops thesaurus Grose-Smith, 1894
Hypochrysops utyi Bethune-Baker, 1913

References

Luciini
Lycaenidae genera
Taxa named by Baron Cajetan von Felder
Taxa named by Rudolf Felder